The Renault NN, generally known to contemporaries simply as the Renault 6 CV, is a compact car or small family car manufactured by Renault from 1924 until 1930.

Details and evolutions
Powered by a four-cylinder 951 cc engine, the NN was first presented at the 1924 Mondial de l'Automobile in Paris as the successor for Renault Type KJ and Type MT. It was in effect a lengthened version of the MT, with an extra  of wheelbase, and the addition of front-wheel brakes.

The exterior design was very simple and family-oriented. Renault at this stage still positioned the radiator behind the engine, which meant that there was no grill at the front, but there were prominent "gills" on the sides of the bonnet/hood for cooling purposes. During 1925, Renault replaced the earlier round logo from 1923 with the first of the long running losange (rhomboid) designs. In January 1926 the bonnet became taller, while in March new more rounded front fenders replaced the earlier flatter units on the Normale and Luxe versions - the base model retained the original fender design. A Torpedo commercial model was also added to the lineup during 1926.

In 1927 the NN1 appeared, with more rounded fenders and now with bumpers installed. The wheelbase remained unchanged but the overall length increased somewhat. In 1928 the heavier NN2 was introduced, this also has bodywork extended between the front leaf springs and is of a generally more substantial appearance. The NN2 also received a single-plate clutch and an integrated rear differential; it remained in production until 1930.

The car could reach between  depending on the gearing. In total, around 150,000 cars were sold. The NN2 was introduced in 1929, a larger and heavier car.

The car was replaced by the Renault Monasix, though this was a larger car and was powered by a (small) 6-cylinder engine. It was only in 1937 that the manufacturer launched a replacement model in the 6 CV class, the Juvaquatre.

Types
NN: Produced from 1924 to 1927
NN1: Produced from 1927 to 1928
NN2: Produced from 1928 to 1930

Sources and notes

NN
Cars introduced in 1924